The Rocklands Reservoir, a water reservoir, is created by a major ungated concretewalled gravity dam with embankment sections across the Glenelg River in the Wimmera region of Victoria, Australia. It is the largest reservoir within the Grampians-Wimmera-Mallee Water (GWMWater) supply system. Originally constructed to supply the Wimmera-Mallee Domestic and Stock channel system, water held by Rocklands Reservoir is now used for many different purposes. A unique feature of Rocklands Reservoir is that all entitlement holders, including the environment, are able to be supplied with water from the reservoir.

Rocklands Dam
Construction of the dam began in 1938. World War II caused construction to cease, and it was recommenced in 1950, with the dam being completed in 1953.

A -long cement gravity dam forms the main wall, and is flanked by two embankment sections. At 100% operating capacity, the dam wall holds back  of water. The spillway is capable of discharging .

Recreation
Rocklands Reservoir is a popular recreational boating location, with power boating, water skiing and jet skiing allowed. Camping is permitted in designated areas. During the duck hunting season, duck shooting is allowed. It is also a popular fishing spot, with Murray cod, redfin, trout and carp taken at all times of the year. Rocklands had a reputation as one of the premier carp fishing destinations in the late 1990s and early 2000s with 10 kg+ carp taken regularly.

References 

Reservoirs in Victoria (Australia)
Glenelg Hopkins catchment
Rivers of Barwon South West (region)
Wimmera